Andrew McCulloch may refer to:

Andrew McCulloch (civil engineer) (1864–1945), Chief Engineer of the Kettle Valley Railway in Canada
Andrew McCulloch (British Army officer) (1876–1960), commander of 52nd Lowland Division from 1934–1935
Andrew McCulloch (politician) (died 1908), Australian politician
Andrew McCulloch (drummer) (born 1945), English drummer
Andrew McCulloch (writer) (born 1945), British television writer and actor
Andrew McCulloch (footballer) (born 1950), English/Scottish footballer between 1970 and 1985